Shanghai International Studies University (SISU) is China's leading university in linguistics, cultural studies, and global and area studies. Established in December 1949, SISU is known for being one of the earliest institutions where China's higher education in foreign languages took shape. It was listed in the Double First Class University identified by the Ministry of Education  and former Project 211.

As of 2021, Shanghai International Studies University ranked no.3 nationwide among universities specialized on languages teaching and research in the widely recognized Best Chinese Universities Ranking.

History
After the founding of the People's Republic of China in 1949, the East China office of the Central Committee of the Chinese Communist Party and the government of the Shanghai Municipality decided to establish an institute for higher education in Russian studies to cultivate qualified diplomats and translators for international affairs. With the support of Mayor Chen Yi, the Shanghai Russian School was officially established in December 1949. Jiang Chunfang, one of the most famous Russian translators in China and the first chief editor of the Encyclopedia of China, was appointed the school's first president.

In 1950, the department of English was established and the college was incorporated as the foreign language school affiliated to the East China People's Revolution University. The department of oriental language and literature was founded in April, 1951 and languages as Burmese, Vietnamese, Indonesian had respectively been introduced to teaching.

Later in 1952, a nationwide restructuring of institutes of higher education began in China, and the department of oriental language and literature was incorporated into Peking University. The college was renamed as Shanghai Russian College that specialise in teaching Russian language. The university was used to be widely known as Shanghai Foreign Language Institute since its expansion in 1956 and became a national key university approved by the State Council in 1963 with the department of Russian, English (re-established), French, German, Japanese, Arabic and Spanish.

Approved by the Ministry of Education in 1994, it was officially renamed as Shanghai International Studies University. In the same year, it was listed as one of the first colleges and universities jointly supervised by the national Ministry of Education and the Municipality of Shanghai. In 1996, SISU passed the evaluation process of former Project 211 directed by the Ministry of Education, and then, SISU was included in the Double First Class University Plan designed by the Chinese central government.

Academics

Schools and Departments

Ranking 
Shanghai International studies university is ranked the 76th in the QS BRICS 2016, the 142nd in the QS Asian University Rankings, and its linguistics is ranked 151–200 in the QS ranking by subject. As of 2021, Shanghai International Studies University ranked no.3 nationwide among universities specialized on languages teaching and research in the widely recognized Best Chinese Universities Ranking.

Graduate Education 

There are 33 Master's Programs:(30 research programs) Adult Education, Ancient Chinese Literature, Arabic Language and Literature, Asian-African Languages and Literatures, Chinese and Foreign Political Institution, Chinese Linguistics and Philology, Communication, Comparative Literature and World Literature, Corporate Management, Curriculum and Teaching Methodology, Diplomacy, Education in Ideology and Politics, Educational Technology, English Language and Literature, European Languages and Literatures, Finance, French Language and Literature, Foreign Linguistics and Applied Linguistics, German Language and Literature, International Politics, International Relations, International Trade, Japanese Language and Literature, Journalism, Linguistics and Applied Linguistics, Modern and Contemporary Chinese Literature, Russian Language and Literature, Spanish Language and Literature, Technology Economy and Management, Translation Studies; (3 taught programs) Translation and Interpreting (MTI), Business Administration (MBA), Teaching Chinese to Speakers of Other Languages (MTCSOL).

There are 12 Doctoral Programs: English Language and Literature, Russian Language and Literature, French Language and Literature, German Language and Literature, Japanese Language and Literature, Arabic Language and Literature, Asian and African Languages and Literatures, Translation Studies, International Relations, Foreign Linguistics and Applied Linguistics, International Politics, Diplomacy.

The Graduate Institute of Interpretation and Translation (GIIT) of SISU is awarded the highest ranking by AIIC, the International Association of Conference Interpreters, as the only Asian university among the 15 top professional conference interpreting schools in the world.

Global Presence 
The University has entered into partnerships with 286 universities and institutions in 55 countries and regions.

Campus
SISU has two campuses, one in Hongkou District and one in Songjiang District.

Hongkou Campus
The Hongkou campus is located in the center of Shanghai, covering 16.9 hectares.

Songjiang Campus
The Songjiang campus is in Shanghai's Songjiang New District, covering an area of 53.3 hectares.

Notable people

Notable alumni

 Chen Chen - television presenter and host
 Joan Chen - Chinese American actress, film director, screenwriter, and film producer
 Li Jinjun - Chinese Ambassador to the Democratic People's Republic of Korea, former Vice Minister of International Liaison Department of the Chinese Communist Party
 Li Linsi - Former diplomatic consultant to Chiang Kai-shek
 Pei Minxin, columnist, newspaper editor, and political scientist
 Wang Yeping - Former First Lady of China (wife of Jiang Zemin)
 Zhang Hanhui - Ambassador of China to Russia and formerly Kazakhstan

References

Further reading

External links

 Shanghai International Studies University
 Shanghai International Studies University (English Homepage)
 Shanghai International Studies University School of Chinese Studies and Exchange
 

 
Project 211
Universities and colleges in Shanghai
Language education in China
Hongkou District
1949 establishments in China
Educational institutions established in 1949